Davika Hoorne, known as Mai, is a Thai actress, model and singer, who made her acting debut in 2010 - Ngao Kammathep series as a lead. She rose to fame with a film: Heart Attack aka "Freelance" opposite Sunny Suwanmethanon. Her other notable works are Suddenly Twenty, My Ambulance and Pee Mak alongside Mario Maurer. She has won multiple awards for her work, including Best Actress at the Bangkok Critics Assembly Awards, Best Actress for two consecutive years at the Thai Film Director Awards and Best Actress at the 25th Subannahongsa Awards for her movie “Freelance".

Early life and education
Davikah was born to a Belgian father and a Thai mother in Bangkok. Her mother nicknamed her "Mai" after singer Mai Charoenpura. Her parents divorced when she was 10 years old, and then was raised by her mother and aunt.

In 2014, Davikah bought a house, post her father's retirement, for him and his new family to live in Thailand.

Davikah obtained her high school degree from Kevalee International School in Bangkok and is currently completing a Bachelor's degree in Communication Arts at Rangsit University's International Programme.

Career
In 2010, Davikah made her acting debut as a female lead role in the television series Ngao Kammathep, and rose to fame with the films Heart Attack aka 'Freelance', is a movie made by top indie director Nawapol Thamrongrattanarit for GTH, which won eight Golden Swans at the Subannahongsa Award. Other notable mention is Suddenly Twenty. In 2013, she consolidated her stardom with her role as “Mae Nak” in Pee Mak Phra Khanong, a highly successful movie that garnered more than 1 billion baht in revenue.

In 2019, Davikah started in My Ambulance showcased by One 31 and LINE TV. In 2022 under GMMTV, Davikah starred as a lead in the series Astrophile alongside Vachirawit Chivaaree.

Brand and image
In December 2016, Davikah joined UNICEF in support of the Basket of Hope fundraising campaign to help children affected by emergencies across the world.

In 2021, Davikah attended the Gucci FW21, as a celebrity friend. In 2022, she as a Brand Ambassador attended Gucci's Cosmogonie fashion show in Castle del Monte, Italy.

Personal life 
Since 2018, Davikah has a relationship with Chantavit Dhanasevi.

Filmography

Film

Television series

Music video appearances

Awards and nominations

References

External links
 
 

Living people
Davika Hoorne
Davika Hoorne
Davika Hoorne
Davika Hoorne
Davika Hoorne
Davika Hoorne
Davika Hoorne
Davika Hoorne
1992 births